Garfield's Thanksgiving is a 1989 American animated television special based on the Garfield comic strip. It once again featured Lorenzo Music as the voice of Garfield. The special was first broadcast November 22, 1989 on CBS and was nominated for Outstanding Animated Program at the 42nd Primetime Emmy Awards. The events of the special take place during the second season of Garfield and Friends. It has been released on both VHS and DVD home video. On overseas DVD copies of Garfield's Holiday Celebrations, this special is replaced with Garfield in the Rough.

This was the tenth of twelve Garfield television specials made between 1982 and 1991.

Plot 
Garfield checks the calendar date one morning and discovers that he has an appointment with the vet that day. When he removes the date hoping to make Jon forget, he notices that tomorrow is Thanksgiving and instantly demands Jon to buy the food for Thanksgiving dinner. Jon Arbuckle agrees, but takes Garfield to the vet on the way home from the supermarket, making him panic.

While at the vet, Dr. Liz Wilson examines Garfield, while Jon tries to talk her into going out on a date with him. Liz reports Garfield is "healthy as a horse" but, out of concern for his weight, is putting the cat on a strict diet, to Garfield's dismay. Jon threatens to suffocate his way through the rest of the visit until Liz says she'll go out with him. When Garfield and Jon simultaneously faint, an exasperated Liz agrees to the date out of annoyance, and Jon invites her to his house for Thanksgiving dinner.

Back home, Jon is excited that Liz is coming over, but Garfield is absolutely miserable at being put on a diet. After eating half a leaf of lettuce for lunch, Garfield tries to raid the refrigerator but is prevented by Odie, whom Jon has assigned to make sure the cat himself doesn't try to cheat on his diet. Later, Garfield weighs himself on his talking weight scale and destroys it for comparing him to Orson Welles, and is repeatedly foiled by Odie when he tries to steal cookies, flour, salt and sugar. Garfield then wonders if the lack of food is making him hallucinate.

The next morning, Garfield is even grumpier than usual, but Jon pays him no mind as he begins preparing the Thanksgiving meal. However, Jon doesn't have a clue on how to prepare such a dinner; he forgot to thaw the turkey or leave enough time to thoroughly cook it and thus tries to compensate by raising the oven's temperature from 325 to 500 degrees Fahrenheit, ignores the stuffing, when told to "rub skin with butter" rubs it on his own skin, and throws all the vegetables in a pile in water on the stove (to which Garfield attempts to sabotage the vegetables by adding garlic powder). Jon shaves and picks a suit, just in time for Liz to arrive and notice he's not wearing pants. As Jon leaves to check on the meal, Liz spends some time with Garfield, casually listing some of the symptoms of excess dieting, some of which he experiences (like irritability and fatigue) and others he obviously fakes (such as dementia and twitches). She concludes that since Garfield is otherwise healthy, he instead may only need some light exercise, and Garfield kisses her in delight.

In the kitchen, Jon is faced with a still frozen turkey and admits defeat in his attempt to cook dinner. Garfield manages to convince Jon to call Grandma, who arrives seconds later and shoos Jon out of the kitchen. As Jon distracts Liz by giving her a history lesson about Thanksgiving (and Liz dozes off), Grandma proceeds to cook the meal: she cuts the still-frozen turkey into slices with a chainsaw, adds white sauce then batters and deep fries the slices into croquettes, after which she prepares sweet potatoes by covering them with butter, brown sugar and marshmallows, finishing with "split-second cranberry sauce" (from the can) and pumpkin pie. Once everything is ready, Grandma tells Garfield that Liz couldn't have found a better man than Jon and that she'd better not blow it, then asks Garfield to eat a piece of pie for her as she leaves.

Garfield tells Jon and Liz that everything is ready, and they all proceed into the dining room to eat. Afterwards, Liz declares that it was a wonderful meal and agrees to come back next year, then thanks Jon for inviting her with a kiss on the cheek. Once Liz leaves, Jon, Garfield and Odie declare it was a great day and they're thankful for Grandma. They decide to head out for a walk to work off the meal, but Odie is too bloated from overeating to get off the couch. Jon immediately puts Odie on a diet, and Garfield gleefully torments Odie into doing push-ups as payback for yesterday.

Voice cast 
 Lorenzo Music as Garfield
 Thom Huge as Jon Arbuckle
 Gregg Berger as Odie
 Julie Payne as Dr. Liz Wilson
 Pat Carroll as Grandma

Songs 
 "Make Thanksgiving One Whole Meal" by Lou Rawls
 "It's a Quiet Celebration" by Desirée Goyette

Book adaptation 
The book adaptation, which retains the original title "Garfield's Thanksgiving," deviates in the following ways:

 Odie and the scale are not involved in Garfield's torment, and Jon – too deliriously happy about having Liz over for Thanksgiving dinner – is ignorant to the fact that Garfield is in misery. Garfield is also weak and suffers from insomnia, resulting in a sleepless night.
 More of Jon's self-ruined Thanksgiving dinner is shown. In the end, the turkey he did not thaw or butter is in terrible state, the sabotaged vegetables are smoking, and the pie he made is burnt. Jon is the one to decide to call Grandma without needing Garfield to offer the idea.
 At the end, there is no mention of any new diets. Odie and Garfield simply sit comfortably with their full bellies as Jon sees Liz out the door, the three agree unanimously that they have Grandma to thank.

Production 
 Created by Jim Davis
 Written by Jim Davis and Kim Campbell
 Original Music by Ed Bogas and Desirée Goyette
 Produced and directed by Phil Roman
 Recording Engineer Gary Clayton

References

External links 
 
 
  (official Garfield & Friends channel)

1980s American television specials
1980s animated television specials
1980s American animated films
1989 in American television
1989 television specials
Television shows directed by Phil Roman
CBS television specials
Garfield television specials
Thanksgiving television specials
Film Roman television specials
Television shows written by Jim Davis (cartoonist)